The 2010 Slovenian Supercup was a football match between the 2009–10 PrvaLiga champions Koper and the 2009–10 Slovenian Football Cup winners Maribor. Usually the supercup final is played at the stadium of the league champions, however, in this edition it was played at the Ljudski vrt stadium in Maribor, because the Bonifika Stadium in Koper was closed at the time due to renovations.

Match details

See also
2009–10 Slovenian PrvaLiga
2009–10 Slovenian Football Cup
2010–11 NK Maribor season

Slovenian Supercup
Supercup
Slovenian Supercup 2010
Slovenian Supercup 2010
Slovenian Supercup 2010